Exapion fuscirostre (formerly Apion fuscirostre) is a species of straight-snouted weevil known by the general common name Scotch broom seed weevil. It is used as an agent of biological pest control against the noxious weed known as Scotch broom (Cytisus scoparius).

The adult weevil is dark gray with a dark band across its elytra and is a laterally compressed shape with a long snout and light brown legs. The adult feeds on new growth at the tips of stems, but the larva does much more damage to the plant. The adult female lays eggs inside the plant's seed pod, where the larvae hatch and consume the seeds over a period of a few weeks.

This weevil is native to Europe. It has been released in the western United States, where it has shown promise as a biocontrol agent for Scotch broom. It is now widespread in the Pacific Northwest.

There is a parasitic wasp, Pteromalus sequester, that uses the weevil as a host. This could possibly hinder efforts to keep the weevil established, but further study is needed.

References 

 Coombs, E. M., et al., Eds. (2004). Biological Control of Invasive Plants in the United States. Corvallis: Oregon State University Press, 164.

External links 
 Control of Scotch Broom

Brentidae
Beetles described in 1775
Taxa named by Johan Christian Fabricius
Insects used for control of invasive plants
Biological pest control beetles